The Magyar Kupa, is a national cup for professional men's volleyball in Hungary, organized by the Hungarian Volleyball Federation since the 1951 season. Between 1957-58 and 1961–62, the event was not held three consecutive seasons.

Most successful team of the Hungarian Men's Volleyball Cup are Kaposvár Volley with eighteen titles.

Winners
In 1954, 1955 and 1957, the cup was held on a grand scale. In 1983 they played two series (in March and December). In 1967 and 1968 the finals were played only in the following year.
Previous cup winners are: 

 1951: Csepel
 1952: Újpest
 1953: Csepel
 1954: Not Played
 1955: Újpest
 1956: Vasas
 1957: Újpest
 1957/58: Bp. Spartacus
 1958–61: Not Played
 1961/62: Újpest
 1962/63: Bp. Honvéd
 1964: Újpest
 1965: Bp. Honvéd
 1966: Bp. Honvéd
 1967: Bp. Honvéd
 1968: Bp. Honvéd
 1969: Csepel
 1970: Csepel
 1971: Csepel
 1972: Csepel
 1973: Újpest
 1974: Csepel
 1975: Újpest
 1976: Csepel
 1977: Bp. Spartacus
 1978: Csepel
 1979: Csepel
 1980: Csepel
 1981: Csepel
 1981/82: Csepel
 1982/83: Kecskemét
 1983/84: Tungsram
 1984/85: Tungsram
 1985/86: Tungsram
 1986/87: Tungsram
 1987/88: Kecskemét
 1988/89: Újpest
 1989/90: Csepel
 1990/91: Nyíregyháza
 1991/92: Kaposvár
 1992/93: Szeged
 1993/94: Kaposvár
 1994/95: Szeged
 1995/96: Szeged
 1996/97: Kaposvár
 1997/98: Kaposvár
 1998/99: Kaposvár
 1999/00: Kaposvár
 2000/01: Szeged
 2001/02: Kaposvár
 2002/03: Kaposvár
 2003/04: Kazincbarcika
 2004/05: Kazincbarcika
 2005/06: Kaposvár
 2006/07: Kaposvár
 2007/08: Kaposvár
 2008/09: Kaposvár
 2009/10: Kaposvár
 2010/11: Kaposvár
 2011/12: Kaposvár
 2012/13: Kaposvár
 2013/14: Kecskemét
 2014/15: Kaposvár
 2015/16: Kaposvár
 2016/17: Szolnok
 2017/18: Kazincbarcika
 2018/19:

Performances

By club
The performance of various clubs is shown in the following table:

Notes

By county

 The bolded teams are currently playing in the 2018-19 season of the Hungarian League.

References

External links
 Hungarian Volleyball Federaration 

Magyar Kupa Men
Cup